Allison Elizabeth Aiello (born 1972) is an American epidemiologist. She is a professor of Epidemiology and a Carolina Population Center Fellow at the University of North Carolina at Chapel Hill.  Aiello is an expert in influenza, investigating non-pharmaceutical interventions for flu prevention.

Early life and education
Aiello was born in 1972. She earned her Bachelor of Science degree from the University of Massachusetts Amherst, her Master's degree from the UNC Gillings School of Global Public Health and her PhD in Epidemiology from the Columbia University Mailman School of Public Health. Following her PhD, Aiello became a Robert Wood Johnson Health & Society Scholar for two years at the University of Michigan.

Career
Upon completing her Robert Wood Johnson Health & Society Scholar Fellowship in 2005, Aiello was appointed an assistant professor of Epidemiology at the institution. In this role, she collaborated with Arnold Monto on a Centers for Disease Control and Prevention-funded study investigating "the feasibility and effectiveness of non-pharmaceutical interventions” in reducing the spread of influenza." They wished to determine whether wearing surgical masks and hand sanitizing could prevent the spread of flu or other respiratory illnesses. She later collaborated with Jennifer Dowd to study the role latent pathogens played in the development of cardiovascular disease, dementia and other illnesses. They found that socioeconomic status played a vital role in a marker of cell-mediated immunity. The conclusion of their study showed evidence that lower socioeconomic status may influence mental health outcomes through stress related alterations in immunity and inflammation.

As a result of her research into the epidemiologic and mechanistic link between social factors, infectious agents, immune response, and the development of chronic diseases of aging, Aiello was elected Carolina Population Center Faculty fellow. In the same year, she also published a set of strategies and guidelines for hospitals to increase adherence to hand-hygiene practices. These included using alcohol-based hand rubs with alcohol concentrations between 62 and 95 percent when hands were visibly soiled. In 2015, Aiello co-develop a model that allows researchers to predict the spread of influenza through a mobile app that monitors human interactions.

In 2018, Aiello was the recipient of a five-year, $3.5 million National Institute on Minority Health and Health Disparities grant to "examine the impact of psychosocial exposures upon people’s cardiometabolic and mental health." They conducted research into DNA methylation and gene expression relevant to life-course psychosocial stressors among participants. The following year, she was awarded the 2019 Carol J. Rowland Hogue Mid-career Achievement Award from the Society for Epidemiologic Research, which recognizes a mid-career scientist who has made "an exceptional contribution to the practice of epidemiology".

During the COVID-19 pandemic in North America, Aiello helped create guidelines for the World Health Organization (WHO) to recommend that people should follow to stem the spread of the COVID-19 virus. She also worked alongside members of the North Carolina Department of Health and Human Services to grasp how widespread cases of COVID-19 with mild or no symptoms are in the state and to monitor the prevalence of the disease over time.

References

External links

Living people
1972 births
American women epidemiologists
American epidemiologists
University of Michigan alumni
UNC Gillings School of Global Public Health alumni
Influenza researchers
21st-century American women